
Year 873 (DCCCLXXIII) was a common year starting on Thursday (link will display the full calendar) of the Julian calendar.

Events 
 By place 
 Europe 
 Carloman, son of King Charles the Bald, is hauled before a secular court and condemned to death – for plotting against his father. He is blinded, but avoids imprisonment by escaping to the East Frankish Kingdom, where his uncle, Louis the German, gives him protection.
 Al-Andalus: The city of Toledo (modern Spain) rises up for a second time against Umayyad rule, due to ethnic tensions over two years.

 Britain 
 The Danish Great Heathen Army, led by the Viking leaders Halfdan and Guthrum, attack Mercia and capture the royal centre at Repton (Derbyshire). The Vikings establish an encampment with a U-shape ditch, on the south bank of the River Trent and spend the winter there.
 Abbasid Caliphate 
 Azugitin, Abbasid caliph Al-Mu'tamid appointed Azugitin as governor of Mosul with deputies.
 Muhammad ibn Ali al-Armani, was killed at the Caliphate - Byzantine border in 873.
 Muhammad ibn Tahir, Muslim governor of Khorasan, is overthrown by the Saffarids, led by Ya'qub ibn al-Layth, who conquer the capital, Nishapur. Khorasan is annexed to their own empire in eastern Persia. The Tahirid Dynasty falls.

 China 
 August 15 – Emperor Yi Zong (Li Cuī) dies after a 13-year reign. He is succeeded by his 11-year-old son Xi Zong, as ruler of the Tang Dynasty. During his reign, a widespread failure of the agricultural harvest leads to famine (which causes people to resort to cannibalism) and agrarian rebellions.

Births 
 Abdullah al-Mahdi Billah, was the founder of the Isma'ili Fatimid Empire, the only major Shi'a caliphate in the 10th century history, and the eleventh Imam of the Isma'ili faith (d. 934)
 Abu Yazid, Kharijite Berber leader (d. 947)
 Ahmad al-Muhajir, Muslim imam (d. 956)
 Al-Tabarani, Muslim hadith scholar (d. 970)
 Fujiwara no Sadakata, Japanese poet (d. 932)
 Ordoño II, king of Galicia and León (d. 924)

Deaths 
 July 8 – Gunther, archbishop of Cologne
 August 1 – Thachulf, duke of Thuringia
 August 15 – Yi Zong, emperor of the Tang Dynasty (b. 833)

 Al-Kindi, Muslim philosopher and polymath 
 Du Cong, chancellor of the Tang Dynasty (b. 794)
 Ecgberht I, king of Northumbria
 Hunayn ibn Ishaq, Muslim scholar and physician (b. 809)
 Ivar the Boneless, Viking leader (approximate date)
 John III, Syriac Orthodox patriarch of Antioch
 Kang Chengxun, general of the Tang Dynasty 
 Lethlobar mac Loingsig, king of Ulaid (Ireland)
 Malik ibn Tawk, Muslim governor
 Muhammad ibn Ali al-Armani, Muslim general
 Rodrigo, Asturian nobleman
 Rodulf Haraldsson, Viking leader
 Shinshō, Japanese Buddhist monk (b. 797)
 Vímara Peres, Asturian nobleman
 Wei Baoheng, chancellor of the Tang Dynasty

References